Maianthemum scilloideum is a perennial flowering plant. It is a terrestrial forest herb from southern Mexico and Guatemala and also reported from Honduras.

Description
Stems are leafy, upright, hairless and smooth or ribbed.

Leaves
They are either sessile and clasping or have a short, 2-3 mm long petiole. Leaf blades are hairless, shiny, oval to egg-shaped with pointed tips and rounded bases and with flat (not undulating) edges. The veins are evident.

Flowering clusters
8 to 27 flowers are set in a complex raceme with a main axis 1.4 – 4 cm long that droops at first, becoming erect. The axis is ribbed, green or maroon and usually smooth. There are 4 to 8 nodes along the main axis, 2-7 mm apart and arraigned in a helix around the main axis. Each node has 2 to 3 (sometimes 4) flowers set on spreading pedicels that are usually 3.5 to 8 mm long.

Flowers and fruits  
The flowers have spreading white tepals 3-6 mm long. Stamens are inserted at the base of the tepals. Fruits are rounded, 6-8 mm across, green when immature, ripening to red. Flowering is from April to August, fruits are retained June to December.

Distribution
Maianthemum scilloideum has been documented in Guatemala, in Honduras (La Paz) and in Mexico in the states of Chiapas, Coahuila, Guerrero, Michoacán, Nuevo León, Oaxaca, Puebla and Veracruz.

Habitat and ecology
It has been found at sites from 1400 to 3500 m elevation. It is a terrestrial herb forming loose colonies in understories of confier-oak forests.

References

Bibliography

scilloideum
Flora of Chiapas
Flora of Coahuila
Flora of Guerrero
Flora of Michoacán
Flora of Nuevo León
Flora of Oaxaca
Flora of Puebla
Flora of Veracruz
Flora of Guatemala
Flora of Honduras